The institution of interrex existed in the Crown of the Kingdom of Poland, whose ruling classes liked to view their Commonwealth as an heir to Roman Empire traditions. The Commonwealth's monarch, holding a double title of the Two Nations (King of Poland and Grand Duke of Lithuania), entered into their office by free election (wolna elekcja), which often led to a relatively long interregnum. Since 1572, the role of interrex traditionally fell to the Archbishop of Gniezno and Primate of Poland of the Roman Catholic Church. The Archbishop could nominate a replacement (traditionally he would choose the Bishop of Kujawy).

The interrex would represent the country on the international scene and oversee the internal administration until a new king was elected. In special circumstances he could declare war and negotiate peace. He summoned and presided over the convocation sejm and the election sejm, the gathering of nobility that elected the king. He also announced the election of the king.

See also
Interrex
Regent

 
Polish–Lithuanian Commonwealth
Heads of state of Poland
Polish titles